Juliette May Fraser (January 27, 1887 – July 31, 1983) was an American painter, muralist and printmaker. She was born in Honolulu, which was then the capital city of the Kingdom of Hawaii. After graduating from Wellesley College with a degree in art, she returned to Hawaii for several years. She continued her studies with Eugene Speicher and Frank DuMond at the Art Students League of New York and at the John F. Carlson School of Landscape Painting in Woodstock, New York. She returned to Hawaii to teach, like her parents who had both come to Hawaii as educators.  Fraser designed the Hawaii Sesquicentennial half dollar, which was engraved by Chester Beach and issued in 1928.

In 1934, during the Great Depression, Fraser was invited to create a work of art for the Hawaii State Library by the Works Progress Administration. For three months she received $35 a week to work on the project. When the funds ran out, she continued on her own until ten murals were completed. Fraser also created murals for the 1939 Golden Gate International Exposition (now installed in lobby of the Hamilton Library, University of Hawaii at Manoa) and the Ypapandi (or Ypapanti) Chapel on Chios Island in Greece. She died in Honolulu in 1983.

The Fine Arts Museums of San Francisco, Hawaii State Art Museum, Hawaii State Library, Honolulu Museum of Art, Isaacs Art Center, Library of Congress (Washington, D. C.), Metropolitan Museum of Art, Nelson-Atkins Museum of Art (Kansas City, Missouri) and University of Hawaii at Manoa are among the public collections holding works by Juliette May Fraser.

References

Further reading
 Armitage, George Thomas, Ghost dog and other Hawaiian, illustrated by Juliette May Fraser, Honolulu, Hawaii, Advertiser Publishing Co., 1944.
 Colum, Padraic, At the gateways of the day, with illustrations by Juliette May Fraser, New Haven, Yale University Press, 1924.
 Colum, Padraic, The bright islands, with illustrations by Juliette May Fraser, New Haven, Yale university press, 1925.
 Department of Education, State of Hawaii, Artists of Hawaii, Honolulu, Department of Education, State of Hawaii, 1985, pp. 23–30.
 Forbes, David W., Encounters with Paradise: Views of Hawaii and its People, 1778-1941, Honolulu Academy of Arts, 1992, 210-247.
 Fraser, Juliette May and Katherine B. Allen (interviewer), "Juliette May Fraser", The Watumull Foundation, Oral History Project, Honolulu, 1979.
 Haar, Francis and Neogy, Prithwish, Artists of Hawaii: Nineteen Painters and Sculptors, University of Hawaii Press, 1974, 58-65.
 Hartwell, Patricia L. (editor), Retrospective 1967-1987, Hawaii State Foundation on Culture and the Arts, Honolulu, Hawaii, 1987, p. 33
 Honolulu Academy of Arts, Juliette May Fraser, A Retrospective Honoring the Artist's 85th Year, Honolulu Academy of Arts, 1972.
 Morris, Nancy J. "The Murals of Ipapandi Chapel, Chios: A Cultural Bridge Between Greece and Hawai'i". The Hawaiian Journal of History, 1994.
 Morse, Morse (ed.), Honolulu Printmakers, Honolulu, HI, Honolulu Academy of Arts, 2003, pp. 23, 47 & 53, 
 Papanikolas, Theresa and DeSoto Brown, Art Deco Hawai'i, Honolulu, Honolulu Museum of Art, 2014, pp. 74–75
 Pratt, Helen Gay, The Hawaiians: an island people. Drawings by Rosamond S. Morgan and Juliette May Fraser, Rutland, Vt., C. E. Tuttle Co., 1963.
 Pratt, Helen Gay, Outdoors in Hawaii. Illustrated by Juliette May Fraser, New York, Scribner, 1948.
 Radford, Georgia and Warren Radford, Sculpture in the Sun, Hawaii's Art for Open Spaces, University of Hawaii Press, 1978, 92-93.
 Sandulli, Justin M., Troubled Paradise: Madge Tennent at a Hawaiian Crossroads, Durham, NC: Duke University, 2016.
 Slabaugh, Arlie, "Hawaiian Sesquicentennial Half Dollar", Numismatic Scrapbook Magazine, August 20, 1960, 2462.
 Yoshihara, Lisa A., Collective Visions, 1967-1997, An Exhibition Celebrating the 30th Anniversary of the State Foundation on Culture and the Arts, Art in Public Places Program, Presented at the Honolulu Academy of Arts, September 3-October 12, 1997, Honolulu, State Foundation on Culture and the Arts, 1997, p. 18.

American women painters
Wellesley College alumni
Art Students League of New York alumni
Artists from Honolulu
John F. Carlson School of Landscape Painting alumni
Hawaiian Kingdom people
1887 births
1983 deaths
Works Progress Administration workers
Painters from Hawaii
American women printmakers
Printmakers from Hawaii
20th-century American painters
20th-century American women artists
20th-century American printmakers
American currency designers
Coin designers